Michele Joseph Cecere (born 4 January 1968) is an English former professional footballer who played in the Football League and in the Premier League as a striker for Oldham Athletic, Huddersfield Town, Stockport County, Walsall, Exeter City and Rochdale.

Personal life 
After his Retirement from Football, Mike Cecere moved into world of Banking, joining HBOS plc, now part of Lloyds Banking Group.

References

External links
 

1968 births
Living people
Sportspeople from Chester
English footballers
Association football forwards
Oldham Athletic A.F.C. players
Huddersfield Town A.F.C. players
Stockport County F.C. players
Walsall F.C. players
Exeter City F.C. players
Rochdale A.F.C. players
English Football League players